The Ultimate Collection 1968–2003 is a compilation album by Joe Cocker, released in 2003 (see 2003 in music).

Track listing

Disc 1
"Unchain My Heart" - 5:04
"Feelin' Alright" - 4:11
"Summer in the City" - 3:50
"You Can Leave Your Hat On" - 4:14
"Up Where We Belong" - 3:56
"You Are So Beautiful" - 2:42
"With a Little Help from My Friends" - 5:11
"Cry Me a River" (live) - 4:00
"The Letter" (live) - 4:25
"Delta Lady" - 2:51
"Many Rivers to Cross" - 3:46
"When the Night Comes" - 4:46
"Night Calls" - 3:26
"Don't You Love Me Anymore" - 5:10
"She Came in Through the Bathroom Window" - 2:39

Disc 2
"Could You Be Loved" - 4:15
"Civilized Man" - 3:53
"First We Take Manhattan" - 3:44
"The Simple Things" - 4:46
"N'Oubliez Jamais" - 4:41
"That's All I Need to Know" (live) - 4:03
"Have a Little Faith in Me" - 4:41
"Don't Let the Sun Go Down on Me" - 5:31
"Now That the Magic Has Gone" - 4:41
"Sweet Little Woman" - 4:03
"(All I Know) Feels Like Forever" - 4:42
"My Father's Son" - 4:31
"Sorry Seems to Be the Hardest Word" - 4:00
"Never Tear Us Apart" - 4:04
"Ruby Lee" - 7:44

Charts

Weekly charts

Year-end charts

Certifications

References

Joe Cocker compilation albums
2003 compilation albums
EMI Records compilation albums